Khorata is a genus of Asian cellar spiders that was first described by B. A. Huber in 2005.

Species
 it contains fifty-one species, found only in Asia:
Khorata bachma Yao & Li, 2018 – Vietnam
Khorata bangkok Huber, 2005 – Thailand, Laos
Khorata bayeri Yao, Li & Jäger, 2014 – Thailand
Khorata circularis Yao & Li, 2013 – Laos
Khorata cucphuong Yao & Li, 2018 – Vietnam
Khorata dangi Yao, Pham & Li, 2015 – Vietnam
Khorata danxia Sheng & Xu, 2021 – China
Khorata dawei Yao & Li, 2019 – China
Khorata diaoluoshanensis Tong & Li, 2008 – China
Khorata digitata Yao & Li, 2010 – China, Vietnam
Khorata dongkou Yao & Li, 2010 – China
Khorata dupla Yao & Li, 2013 – Laos
Khorata epunctata Yao & Li, 2010 – China
Khorata flabelliformis Yao & Li, 2010 – China
Khorata fusui Zhang & Zhu, 2009 – China
Khorata guiensis Yao & Li, 2010 – China
Khorata huberi Yao, Pham & Li, 2015 – Vietnam
Khorata jaegeri Huber, 2005 – Laos
Khorata kep Lan, Jäger & Li, 2021 – Cambodia
Khorata khammouan Huber, 2005 (type) – Laos
Khorata libo Yao & Li, 2019 – China
Khorata liuzhouensis Yao & Li, 2010 – China
Khorata luojinensis Yao & Li, 2010 – China
Khorata luoping Yao & Li, 2019 – China
Khorata macilenta Yao & Li, 2010 – China
Khorata matang Yao & Li, 2019 – China
Khorata miaoshanensis Yao & Li, 2010 – China
Khorata musee Lan & Li, 2021 – Thailand
Khorata nani Xu, Zheng & Yao, 2020 – China
Khorata nanningensis Yao & Li, 2010 – China
Khorata ningming Zhang & Zhu, 2009 – China
Khorata ningyuan Wei & Xu, 2014 – China
Khorata palace Yao & Li, 2018 – Vietnam
Khorata paquini Yao & Li, 2010 – China
Khorata protumida Yao, Pham & Li, 2015 – Vietnam
Khorata qian Yao & Li, 2019 – China
Khorata quangbinh Yao & Li, 2018 – Vietnam
Khorata robertmurphyi Yao & Li, 2010 – China
Khorata rongshuiensis Yao & Li, 2010 – China
Khorata sancai Wei & Xu, 2014 – China
Khorata schwendingeri Huber, 2005 – Thailand, Laos
Khorata shao Yao & Li, 2010 – China
Khorata suwei Yao & Li, 2019 – China
Khorata triangula Yao & Li, 2010 – China
Khorata vinhphuc Yao & Li, 2018 – Vietnam
Khorata wangae Yao & Li, 2010 – China
Khorata wenshan Yao & Li, 2019 – China
Khorata xingyi Chen, Zhang & Zhu, 2009 – China
Khorata yangchun Yao & Li, 2019 – China
Khorata yuhaoi Xu, Zheng & Yao, 2020 – China
Khorata zhui Zhang & Zhang, 2008 – China

See also
 List of Pholcidae species

References

Araneomorphae genera
Pholcidae
Spiders of Asia